is a Japanese racing driver who currently competes in Super Formula Lights and Super GT.

Career

Early career
Ohta's single seater career started in 2018 where he competed in F4 Japanese Championship with MYST for only one round. The next season he competed in the same series with Honda Formula Dream Project, where he managed to claim 2 wins and finished 6th in the standings. Continuing again to compete in F4 Japanese Championship but race with Vegaplus, but he competed third quarters of the season. And for 2021, he competed again in F4 Japanese Championship but returns to Honda Formula Dream Project. Ohta takes the step up to Super Formula Lights with Toda Racing & Super GT - GT300 with Team UpGarage. Ohta managed to reach runners up in Super Formula Lights, beating Honda's teammate Iori Kimura but lose out to the eventual champion Kazuto Kotaka. As in Super GT GT300, he clinched his maiden podium in Okayama.

Super Formula & Super GT - GT500
For 2023, Honda announced that Ohta will step up to Super Formula racing with Dandelion Racing, and as well Super GT - GT500 with Nakajima Racing replacing Hiroki Otsu in all series.

Racing record

Career summary

† As he was a guest driver, Ohta was ineligible to score points.

Complete F4 Japanese Championship results

Complete Super Formula Lights results 
(key) (Races in bold indicate pole position) (Races in italics indicate fastest lap)

Complete Super Formula results
(key) (Races in bold indicate pole position; races in italics indicate fastest lap)

* Season still in progress.

References

External links
 

1999 births
Living people
Japanese racing drivers
Super GT drivers
French F4 Championship drivers
Formula Regional Japanese Championship drivers
Sportspeople from Kyoto
Japanese F4 Championship drivers
Super Formula drivers
Dandelion Racing drivers